This is a list of York Region Transit and Viva Rapid Transit bus routes in York Region, north of Toronto, Canada. The routes are divided into branch routes.

Routes
Route information effective .

Numbering Conventions
 1 to 199 — Regular bus (including TTC contracted routes)
 300 series — Express (50 cents extra fare required)
 400 series — High School Specials
 500 series — Community Bus
 600 series — Viva (used internally)

Separate routes with duplicate names are distinguished by showing cardinal directions in brackets for the portions of the streets each serves.

Mobility On-Request Services

References

B
Transit
York Region